Shabad may refer to:

"Shabad" (hymn)
Shabad, Telangana, a town in India
Zemach Shabad (1864–1935), Lithuanian Jewish doctor and political activist

See also
Shahabad (disambiguation)